The Soaring Association of Canada (SAC) is the national association for glider pilots in Canada. It was founded in 1945 to promote, enhance and protect soaring in Canada. SAC is an affiliation of the 24 Canadian glider clubs.

SAC is affiliated with the Aero Club of Canada, the International Gliding Commission and the Fédération Aéronautique Internationale.

Services

SAC provides a wide range of services to its members including: 
 Aircraft and airfield insurance plans
 Instructors' courses, 
 Training manuals
 Promotes the sport
 Encourages competitions
 Verifies FAI badge claims
 Twice each year magazine, "Free Flight".

It also works with the aviation authorities on such issues:
 Licensing
 Medical requirements
 Airspace
 Communications
 Aircraft certification
 Technical issues

External links
 Soaring Association of Canada

Sports governing bodies in Canada
Gliding in Canada
Gliding associations